Rosevine is an unincorporated community in northwestern Sabine County, Texas, United States, on State Highway 103. In distance, it is located 10 miles northwest of Hemphill. As early as 1936, the population was an estimated 75 residents. As of the census of 2000, the population was estimated at 50, with an operating fire station.

External links
 Rosevine, Texas from the Handbook of Texas online.
 

Unincorporated communities in Sabine County, Texas
Unincorporated communities in Texas